The history of Colombia includes the settlements and society by indigenous peoples, most notably, the Muisca Confederation, Quimbaya Civilization, and Tairona Chiefdoms; the Spanish arrived in 1492 and initiated a period of annexation and colonization, most noteworthy being Spanish conquest; ultimately creating the Viceroyalty of New Granada, with its capital at Bogotá. Independence from Spain was won in 1819, but by 1830 the "Gran Colombia" Federation was dissolved. What is now Colombia and Panama emerged as the Republic of New Granada. The new nation experimented with federalism as the Granadine Confederation (1858), and then the United States of Colombia (1863), before the Republic of Colombia was finally declared in 1886; as well as constant political violence in the country. Panama seceded in 1903. Since the 1960s, the country has suffered from an asymmetric low-intensity armed conflict, which escalated in the 1990s, but then decreased from 2005 onward. The legacy of Colombia's history has resulted in a rich cultural heritage; while varied geography, and the imposing landscape of the country has resulted in the development of very strong regional identities.

Pre-Columbian  period 

From approximately 12,000 years BP onwards, hunter-gatherer societies existed near present-day Bogotá (at El Abra and Tequendama), and they traded with one another and with cultures living in the Magdalena River valley. Due to its location, the present territory of Colombia was a corridor of early human migration from Mesoamerica and the Caribbean to the Andes and the Amazon basin. These sites date from the Paleoindian period (18,000–8000 BCE). At Puerto Hormiga archaeological site and other sites, traces from the Archaic period in South America (~8000–2000 BCE) have been found. Vestiges indicate that there was also early occupation in the regions of El Abra, Tibitó and Tequendama in Cundinamarca. The oldest pottery discovered in the Americas, found at San Jacinto archaeological site, dates to 5000–4000 BCE.
Indigenous people inhabited the territory that is now Colombia by 10,500 BCE. Nomadic hunter-gatherer tribes at the El Abra and Tequendama sites near present-day Bogotá traded with one another and with other cultures from the Magdalena River Valley.

Serranía La Lindosa, a mountainous region of Guaviare Department is known for an extensive prehistoric rock art site which stretches for nearly eight miles. The site, near to the  Guayabero River was discovered in 2019, but was not revealed to the public until 2020. There are tens of thousands of paintings of animals and humans created up to 12,500 BP. Images of now-extinct ice age animals, such as the mastodon, helped date the site. Other ice-age animals depicted include the palaeolama, giant sloths and ice age horses. The site has gone undiscovered because of a conflict between the government and the Farc. The remote site is a two-hour drive from San José del Guaviare, followed by a four hour trek. The site was discovered by a team from National University of Colombia, University of Antioquia and the University of Exeter as part of a project funded by European Research Council as part of the Horizon 2020 Framework Programmes for Research and Technological Development. The site is to be featured in episode 2 of the Channel 4 series, Jungle Mystery: Lost Kingdoms of the Amazon, on 12 December 2020.

Between 5000 and 1000 BCE, hunter-gatherer tribes transitioned to agrarian societies; fixed settlements were established, and pottery appeared. Beginning in the 1st millennium BCE, groups of Amerindians including the Muisca, Quimbaya, Tairona, Calima, Zenú, Tierradentro, San Agustín, Tolima, and Urabá became skilled in farming, mining, and metalcraft; and some developed the political system of cacicazgos with a pyramidal structure of power headed by caciques. The Muisca inhabited mainly the area of what is now the Departments of Boyacá and Cundinamarca high plateau (Altiplano Cundiboyacense) where they formed the Muisca Confederation. The Muisca had one of the most developed political systems (Muisca Confederation) in South America, surpassed only by the Incas. They farmed maize, potato, quinoa and cotton, and traded gold, emeralds, blankets, ceramic handicrafts, coca and especially salt with neighboring nations. The Tairona inhabited northern Colombia in the isolated Andes mountain range of Sierra Nevada de Santa Marta. The Quimbaya inhabited regions of the Cauca River Valley between the Western and Central Ranges. The Incas expanded their empire on the southwest part of the country.

Spanish annexation

Pre-Columbian history 

Europeans first visited the territory that became Colombia in 1499 when the first expedition of Alonso de Ojeda arrived at the Cabo de la Vela. The Spanish made several attempts to settle along the north coast of today's Colombia in the early 16th century, but their first permanent settlement, at Santa Marta, dates from 1525. The Spanish commander Pedro de Heredia founded Cartagena on June 1, 1533 in the former location of the indigenous Caribbean Calamarí village. Cartagena grew rapidly, fueled first by the gold in the tombs of the Sinú Culture, and later by trade. The thirst for gold and land lured Spanish explorers to visit Chibchan-speaking areas; resulting in the Spanish conquest of the Chibchan Nations - the conquest by the Spanish monarchy of the Chibcha language-speaking nations, mainly the Muisca and Tairona who inhabited present-day Colombia, beginning the Spanish colonization of the Americas.

The Spanish advance inland from the Caribbean coast began independently from three different directions, under Jimenéz de Quesáda, Sebastián de Benalcázar (known in Colombia as Belalcázar) and Nikolaus Federmann. Although all three were drawn by the Indian treasures, none intended to reach Muisca territory, where they finally met.
In August 1538, Quesáda founded Santa Fe de Bogotá on the site of Muisca village of Bacatá.

In 1549, the institution of the Spanish Royal Audiencia in Bogotá gave that city the status of capital of New Granada, which comprised in large part what is now the territory of Colombia.  As early as the 1500s however, secret anti-Spanish discontentment was already brewing for Colombians since Spain prohibited direct trade between the Viceroyalty of Peru, which included Colombia, and the Viceroyalty of New Spain, which included the Philippines the source of Asian products like silk and porcelain which was in demand in the Americas. Illegal trade between Peruvians, Filipinos, and Mexicans continued in secret, as smuggled Asian goods ended up in Córdoba, Colombia, the distribution center for illegal Asian imports, due to the collusion between these peoples against the authorities in Spain. They settled and traded with each other while disobeying the forced Spanish monopoly in more expensive silks and porcelain made in homeland Spain.  In 1717, the Viceroyalty of New Granada was originally created, and then it was temporarily removed, to finally be reestablished in 1739. The Viceroyalty had Santa Fé de Bogotá as its capital. This Viceroyalty included some other provinces of northwestern South America which had previously been under the jurisdiction of the Viceroyalties of New Spain or Peru and correspond mainly to today's Venezuela, Ecuador and Panama. So, Bogotá became one of the principal administrative centers of the Spanish possessions in the New World, along with Lima and Mexico City.

Gran Colombia: independence re-claimed 

From then on, the long independence struggle was led mainly by Bolívar and Francisco de Paula Santander in neighboring Venezuela. Bolívar returned to New Granada only in 1819 after establishing himself as leader of the pro-independence forces in the Venezuelan llanos. From there he led an army over the Andes and captured New Granada after a quick campaign that ended at the Battle of Boyacá, on August 7, 1819. (For more information, see Military career of Simón Bolívar.)

That year, the Congress of Angostura established the Republic of Gran Colombia, which included all territories under the jurisdiction of the former Viceroyalty of New Granada. Bolívar was elected the first president of Gran Colombia and Santander, vice president.

As the Federation of Gran Colombia was dissolved in 1830, the Department of Cundinamarca (as established in Angostura) became a new country, the Republic of New Granada.

The Republic: Liberal and Conservative conflict 

In 1863 the name of the Republic was changed officially to "United States of Colombia", and in 1886 the country adopted its present name: "Republic of Colombia".

Two political parties grew out of conflicts between the followers of Bolívar and Santander and their political visions—the Conservatives and the Liberals – and have since dominated Colombian politics. Bolívar's supporters, who later formed the nucleus of the Conservative Party, sought strong centralized government, alliance with the Roman Catholic Church, and a limited franchise. Santander's followers, forerunners of the Liberals, wanted a decentralized government, state rather than church control over education and other civil matters, and a broadened suffrage.

Throughout the 19th and early 20th centuries, each party held the presidency for roughly equal periods of time. Colombia maintained a tradition of civilian government and regular, free elections. The military has seized power three times in Colombia's history: in 1830, after the dissolution of Great Colombia; again in 1854 (by General José María Melo); and from 1953 to 1957 (under General Gustavo Rojas Pinilla). Civilian rule was restored within one year in the first two instances.

Notwithstanding the country's commitment to democratic institutions, Colombia's history has also been characterized by widespread, violent conflict. Two civil wars resulted from bitter rivalry between the Conservative and Liberal parties. The Thousand Days' War (1899–1902) cost an estimated 100,000 lives, and up to 300,000 people died during "La Violencia" of the late 1940s and 1950s, a bipartisan confrontation which erupted after the assassination of Liberal popular candidate Jorge Eliécer Gaitán. United States activity to influence the area (especially the Panama Canal construction and control) led to a military uprising in the Isthmus Department in 1903, which resulted in the separation and independence of Panama.

A military coup in 1953 toppled the right-wing government of Conservative Laureano Gómez and brought General Gustavo Rojas Pinilla to power. Initially, Rojas enjoyed considerable popular support, due largely to his success in reducing "La Violencia". When he did not restore democratic rule and occasionally engaged in open repression, however, he was overthrown by the military in 1957 with the backing of both political parties, and a provisional government was installed.

The National Front regime (1958–1974) 

In July 1957, former Conservative President Laureano Gómez (1950–1953) and former Liberal President Alberto Lleras (1945–1946, 1958–1962) issued the "Declaration of Sitges," in which they proposed a "National Front," whereby the Liberal and Conservative parties would govern jointly. The presidency would be determined by an alternating conservative and liberal president every 4 years for 16 years; the two parties would have parity in all other elective offices.

The National Front ended "La Violencia", and National Front administrations attempted to institute far-reaching social and economic reforms in cooperation with the Alliance for Progress. In particular, the Liberal president Alberto Lleras Camargo (1958–1962) created the Colombian Institute for Agrarian Reform (INCORA), and Carlos Lleras Restrepo (1966–1970) further developed land entitlement. In 1968 and 1969 alone, the INCORA issued more than 60,000 land titles to farmers and workers.

In the end, the contradictions between each successive Liberal and Conservative administration made the results decidedly mixed. Despite the progress in certain sectors, many social and political injustices continued.

The National Front system itself eventually began to be seen as a form of political repression by dissidents and even many mainstream voters, and many protesters were victimized during this period. Especially after what was later confirmed as the fraudulent election of Conservative candidate Misael Pastrana in 1970, which resulted in the defeat of the relatively populist candidate and former president (dictator) Gustavo Rojas Pinilla. The M-19 guerrilla movement, "Movimiento 19 de Abril" (19 April Movement), would eventually be founded in part as a response to this particular event. The FARC was formed in 1964 by Manuel Marulanda Vélez and other Marxist–Leninist supporters, after a military attack on the community of Marquetalia.

Although the system established by the Sitges agreement was phased out by 1974, the 1886 Colombian constitution — in effect until 1991—required that the losing political party be given adequate and equitable participation in the government which, according to many observers and later analysis, eventually resulted in some increase in corruption and legal relaxation. The current 1991 constitution does not have that requirement, but subsequent administrations have tended to include members of opposition parties.

Post-National Front 
From 1974 until 1982, different presidential administrations chose to focus on ending the persistent insurgencies that sought to undermine Colombia's traditional political system. Both groups claimed to represent the poor and weak against the rich and powerful classes of the country, demanding the completion of true land and political reform, from an openly Communist perspective.

By 1974, another challenge to the state's authority and legitimacy had come from 19th of April Movement (M-19), a mostly urban guerrilla group founded in response to an alleged electoral fraud during the final National Front election of Misael Pastrana Borrero (1970–1974) and the defeat of former dictator Gustavo Rojas Pinilla. Initially, the M-19 attracted a degree of attention and sympathy from mainstream Colombians that the FARC and National Liberation Army (ELN) had found largely elusive earlier due to extravagant and daring operations, such as stealing a sword that had belonged to Colombia's Independence hero Simon Bolívar. At the same time, its larger profile soon made it the focus of the state's counterinsurgency efforts.

The ELN guerrilla had been seriously crippled by military operations in the region of Anorí by 1974, but it managed to reconstitute itself and escape destruction, in part due to the administration of Alfonso López Michelsen (1974–1978) allowing it to escape encirclement, hoping to initiate a peace process with the group.

By 1982, the perceived passivity of the FARC, together with the relative success of the government's efforts against the M-19 and ELN, enabled the administration of the Liberal Party's Julio César Turbay (1978–1982) to lift a state-of-siege decree that had been in effect, on and off, for most of the previous 30 years. Under the latest such decree, president Turbay had implemented security policies that, though of some military value against the M-19 in particular, were considered highly questionable both inside and outside Colombian circles due to numerous accusations of military human rights abuses against suspects and captured guerrillas.

Citizen exhaustion due to the conflict's newfound intensity led to the election of president Belisario Betancur (1982–1986), a Conservative who won 47% of the popular vote, directed peace feelers at all the insurgents, and negotiated a 1984 cease-fire with the FARC and M-19 after a 1982 release of many guerrillas imprisoned during the previous effort to overpower them. The ELN rejected entering any negotiation and continued to recover itself through the use of extortions and threats, in particular against foreign oil companies of European and U.S. origin.

As these events were developing, the growing illegal drug trade and its consequences were also increasingly becoming a matter of widespread importance to all participants in the Colombian conflict. Guerrillas and newly wealthy drug lords had mutually uneven relations and thus numerous incidents occurred between them. Eventually, the kidnapping of drug cartel family members by guerrillas led to the creation of the 1981 Muerte a Secuestradores (MAS) death squad ("Death to Kidnappers"). Pressure from the U.S. government and critical sectors of Colombian society was met with further violence, as the Medellín Cartel and its hitmen, bribed or murdered numerous public officials, politicians and others who stood in its way by supporting the implementation of extradition of Colombian nationals to the U.S. Victims of cartel violence included Justice Minister Rodrigo Lara, whose assassination in 1984 made the Betancur administration begin to directly oppose the drug lords.

The first negotiated cease-fire with the M-19 ended when the guerrillas resumed fighting in 1985, claiming that the cease-fire had not been fully respected by official security forces, saying that several of its members had suffered threats and assaults, and also questioning the government's real willingness to implement any accords. The Betancur administration, in turn, questioned the M-19's actions and its commitment to the peace process, as it continued to advance high-profile negotiations with the FARC, which led to the creation of the Patriotic Union (Colombia) (UP), a legal and non-clandestine political organization.

On November 6, 1985, the M-19 stormed the Colombian Palace of Justice and held the Supreme Court magistrates hostage, intending to put president Betancur on trial. In the ensuing crossfire that followed the military's reaction, scores of people lost their lives, as did most of the guerrillas, including several high-ranking operatives. Both sides blamed each other for the outcome.

Meanwhile, individual FARC members initially joined the UP leadership in representation of the guerrilla command, though most of the guerrilla's chiefs and militiamen did not demobilize nor disarm, as that was not a requirement of the process at that point in time. Tension soon significantly increased, as both sides began to accuse each other of not respecting the cease-fire. Political violence against FARC and UP members (including presidential candidate Jaime Pardo) was blamed on drug lords and also on members of the security forces (to a much lesser degree on the argued inaction of Betancur administration). Members of the government and security authorities increasingly accused the FARC of continuing to recruit guerrillas, as well as kidnapping, extorting and politically intimidating voters even as the UP was already participating in politics.

The Virgilio Barco (1986–1990) administration, in addition to continuing to handle the difficulties of the complex negotiations with the guerrillas, also inherited a particularly chaotic confrontation against the drug lords, who were engaged in a campaign of terrorism and murder in response to government moves in favor of their extradition overseas. The UP also suffered an increasing number of losses during this term (including the assassination of presidential candidate Bernardo Jaramillo), which stemmed both from private proto-paramilitary organizations, increasingly powerful drug lords and a number of would-be paramilitary-sympathizers within the armed forces.

Post-1990 
Following administrations had to contend with the guerrillas, paramilitaries, narcotics traffickers and the violence and corruption that they all perpetuated, both through force and negotiation. Narcoterrorists assassinated three presidential candidates before César Gaviria was elected in 1990. Since the death of Medellín cartel leader Pablo Escobar in a police shootout during December 1993, indiscriminate acts of violence associated with that organization have abated as the "cartels" have broken up into multiple, smaller and often-competing trafficking organizations. Nevertheless, violence continues as these drug organizations resort to violence as part of their operations but also to protest government policies, including extradition.

The M-19 and several smaller guerrilla groups were successfully incorporated into a peace process as the 1980s ended and the 1990s began, which culminated in the elections for a Constituent Assembly of Colombia that would write a new constitution, which took effect in 1991. The new Constitution, brought about a considerable number of institutional and legal reforms based on principles that the delegates considered as more modern, humanist, democratic and politically open than those in the 1886 constitution. Practical results were mixed and mingled emerged (such as the debate surrounding the constitutional prohibition of extradition, which later was reversed), but together with the reincorporation of some of the guerrilla groups to the legal political framework, the new Constitution inaugurated an era that was both a continuation and a gradual, but significant, departure from what had come before.

Contacts with the FARC, which had irregularly continued despite the generalized de facto interruptions of the ceasefire and the official 1987 break from negotiations, were temporarily cut off in 1990 under the presidency of César Gaviria (1990–1994). The Colombian Army's assault on the FARC's Casa Verde sanctuary at La Uribe, Meta, followed by a FARC offensive that sought to undermine the deliberations of the Constitutional Assembly, began to highlight a significant break in the uneven negotiations carried over from the previous decade.

President Ernesto Samper assumed office in August 1994. However, a political crisis relating to large-scale contributions from drug traffickers to Samper's presidential campaign diverted attention from governance programs, thus slowing, and in many cases, halting progress on the nation's domestic reform agenda. The military also suffered several setbacks in its fight against the guerrillas, when several of its rural bases began to be overrun and a record number of soldiers and officers were taken prisoner by the FARC (which since 1982 was attempting to implement a more "conventional" style of warfare, seeking to eventually defeat the military in the field).

On August 7, 1998, Andrés Pastrana was sworn in as the President of Colombia. A member of the Conservative Party, Pastrana defeated Liberal Party candidate Horacio Serpa in a run-off election marked by high voter turnout and little political unrest. The new president's program was based on a commitment to bring about a peaceful resolution of Colombia's longstanding civil conflict and to cooperate fully with the United States to combat the trafficking of illegal drugs.

While early initiatives in the Colombian peace process gave reason for optimism, the Pastrana administration also has had to combat high unemployment and other economic problems, such as the fiscal deficit and the impact of global financial instability on Colombia. During his administration, unemployment has risen to over 20%. Additionally, the growing severity of countrywide guerrilla attacks by the FARC and ELN, and smaller movements, as well as the growth of drug production, corruption and the spread of even more violent paramilitary groups such as the United Self-Defense Forces of Colombia (AUC) has made it difficult to solve the country's problems.

Although the FARC and ELN accepted participation in the peace process, they did not make explicit commitments to end the conflict. The FARC suspended talks in November 2000, to protest what it called "paramilitary terrorism" but returned to the negotiating table in February 2001, following 2 days of meetings between President Pastrana and FARC leader Manuel Marulanda. The Colombian Government and ELN in early 2001 continued discussions aimed at opening a formal peace process.

From 2004 and on 

By 2004, the security situation of Colombia had shown some measure of an improvement, and the economy, while still fragile, had also shown some positive signs. On the other hand, relatively little had been accomplished in structurally solving most of the country's other grave problems, in part due to legislative and political conflicts between the administration and the Colombian Congress (including those over the controversial 2006 project to give President Álvaro Uribe the right to be re-elected), and a relative lack of freely allocated funds and credits. In October 2006, Uribe was re-elected by a landslide.

Some critical observers consider in retrospect that Uribe's policies, while admittedly reducing crime and guerrilla activity, were too slanted in favor of a military solution to Colombia's internal war, neglecting grave social and human rights concerns to a certain extent. They hoped that Uribe's government would make serious efforts towards improving the human rights situation inside the country, protecting civilians and reducing any abuses committed by the armed forces.

Uribe's supporters in turn believed that increased military action was a necessary prelude to any serious negotiation attempt with the guerrillas and that the increased security situation would help the government, in the long term, to focus more actively on reducing most wide-scale abuses and human rights violations on the part of both the armed groups and any rogue security forces that might have links to the paramilitaries. In short, these supporters maintained that the security situation needed to be stabilized in favor of the government before any other social concerns could take precedence. In February 2010, the constitutional court blocked President Alvaro Uribe from seeking for a new re-election. Uribe left the presidency in 2010.

In 2010 Juan Manuel Santos was elected president; he was supported by ex-president Uribe, and, in fact, he owed his election mainly through having won over former Uribe supporters. But two years after winning the presidential election, Santos (to widespread surprise) began peace talks with FARC, which took place in Havana. Re-elected in 2014, Santos revived an important infrastructure program, which in fact had been planned during the Uribe administration. Focused mainly on the provision of national highways, the program was led by former vice-president Germán Vargas Lleras.

In 2015,  Colombia's Congress limited presidency to single term, preventing the president from seeking re-election.

Talks between the government and the guerrillas resulted in the announcement of a peace agreement. However, a referendum to ratify the deal was unsuccessful. Afterward, the Colombian government and the FARC signed a revised peace deal in November 2016, which the Colombian congress approved. In 2016, President Santos was awarded the Nobel Peace Prize. The Government began a process of attention and comprehensive reparation for victims of conflict. Colombia under President Santos showed some progress in the struggle to defend human rights, as expressed by HRW. A Special Jurisdiction of Peace was created to investigate, clarify, prosecute and punish serious human rights violations and grave breaches of international humanitarian law which occurred during the armed conflict and to satisfy victims' right to justice. During his visit to Colombia, Pope Francis paid tribute to the victims of the conflict.

In May 2018, Ivan Duque, the candidate of the conservative Centro Democrático (Democratic Centre), won the presidential election. On 7 August 2018, he was sworn in as the new President of Colombia.

Colombia's relations with Venezuela have fluctuated due to the ideological differences between both governments. Colombia has offered humanitarian support with food and medicines to mitigate the shortage of supplies in Venezuela. Colombia's Foreign Ministry said that all efforts to resolve Venezuela's crisis should be peaceful. Colombia proposed the idea of the Sustainable Development Goals and a final document was adopted by the United Nations. In February 2019, Venezuelan president Nicolás Maduro cut diplomatic relations with Colombia after Colombian President Ivan Duque helped Venezuelan opposition politicians deliver humanitarian aid to their country. Colombia recognized Venezuelan opposition leader Juan Guaido as the country's legitimate president. In January 2020, Colombia rejected Maduro's proposal that the two countries restore diplomatic relations.

The 19 June 2022 election run-off vote ended in a win for former guerrilla, Gustavo Petro, taking  50.47% of the vote compared to 47.27% of right-wing Rodolfo Hernández. The single-term limit for the country's presidency prevented president Iván Duque from seeking re-election. Petro became the country’s first leftist president-elect. On 7 August 2022, he was sworn in.

See also 

 Colombia during World War II
 Economic history of Colombia
 History of the Americas
 History of Latin America
 History of South America
 List of presidents of Colombia
 Politics of Colombia
 Spanish colonization of the Americas

References

Bibliography

Further reading 

 Alesina, Alberto, ed. Institutional reforms: The case of Colombia (MIT press, 2005).
 Earle, Rebecca. Spain and the Independence of Colombia, 1810–1825. Exeter: University of Exeter Press, 2000. 
 Echavarría, Juan José, María Angélica Arbeláez, and Alejandro Gaviria. "Recent economic history of Colombia." in Institutional Reforms: The Case of Colombia (2005): 33-72.
 Echeverry, Juan Carlos, et al. "Oil in Colombia: history, regulation and macroeconomic impact." Documento CEDE 2008-10 (2008). online
 Etter, Andrés, Clive McAlpine, and Hugh Possingham. "Historical patterns and drivers of landscape change in Colombia since 1500: a regionalized spatial approach." Annals of the Association of American Geographers 98.1 (2008): 2-23.
 Farnsworth-Alvear, Ann. Dulcinea in the Factory: Myths, Morals, Men, and Women in Colombia's Industrial Experiment, 1905–1960. Duke University Press 2000.
 Fisher, J.R. Allan J. Kuethe, and Anthony McFarlane. Reform and Insurrection in Bourbon New Granada and Peru. Baton Rouge: Louisiana State University Press 1990.
 Flores, Thomas Edward. "Vertical inequality, land reform, and insurgency in Colombia." Peace Economics, Peace Science and Public Policy 20.1 (2014): 5-31. online
 Harvey, Robert. "Liberators: Latin America's Struggle for Independence, 1810–1830". John Murray, London (2000). 
 Kuethe, Allan J. Military Reform and Society in New Granada, 1773–1808. Gainesville: University of Florida Press 1978.
 LeGrand, Catherine. Frontier Expansion and Peasant Protest in Colombia, 1850–1936. Albuquerque: University of New Mexico Press 1986.
 López-Pedreros, A. Ricardo. Makers of democracy: a transnational history of the middle classes in Colombia (Duke University Press, 2019).
 McFarlane, Anthony. Colombia Before Independence: Economy, Society, and Politics under Bourbon Rule. Cambridge: Cambridge University Press, 1993. 
 Martz, John D. The politics of clientelism in Colombia: Democracy and the state (Routledge, 2017).
 Murillo, Mario A., and Jesus Rey Avirama. Colombia and the United States: war, unrest, and destabilization (Seven Stories Press, 2004).
 Phelan, John Leddy. The People and the King: The Comunero Revolt in Colombia, 1781. Madison: University of Wisconsin Press 1978.
 Racine, Karen. "Simón Bolívar and friends: Recent biographies of independence figures in Colombia and Venezuela" History Compass 18#3 (Feb 2020) https://doi.org/10.1111/hic3.12608
 Roldán, Mary. Blood and Fire: La Violencia in Antioquia, Colombia 1946–1953. Durham: Duke University Press 2002.
 Safford, Frank. Colombia: Fragmented Land, Divided Society. New York: Oxford University Press 2002.
 Sharp, William Frederick. Slavery on the Spanish Frontier: The Colombia Chocó, 1680–1810. Norman: University of Oklahoma Press 1976.
 Thorp, Rosemary, and Francisco Durand. "8. A Historical View of Business-State Relations: Colombia, Peru, and Venezuela Compared." in Business and the state in developing countries. (Cornell University Press, 2018) pp. 216–236.
 Twinam, Ann. Miners, Merchants, and Farmers in Colonial Colombia. Austin: University of Texas Press 1983.
 West, Robert C. Colonial Placer Mining in Colombia. Baton Rouge: Louisiana State University Press 1952.

In Spanish

 Arciniegas, Germán. Los comuneros. Caracas: Bibliotecta Ayacucho 1992.
 Colmenares, Germán. Historia económica y social de Colombia, 1537–1719. Cali 1973.
 González, Margarita. El resguardo en el Nuevo Reino de Granada. 3rd edition. Bogotá: El Ancora 1992.

External links 
 
 U.S. State Department Background Note: Colombia